MKS Będzin SA is a Polish professional men's volleyball club based in Będzin, founded in 2005. From 2014 to 2021, the club competed in the Polish PlusLiga. Since the 2021–22 season, the club has been playing in the 1st Polish Volleyball League.

See also

References

External links
 Official website 
 Team profile at Volleybox.net

Polish volleyball clubs
Sport in Silesian Voivodeship
Volleyball clubs established in 2005
2005 establishments in Poland